Bannykus is an alvarezsaur from the Early Cretaceous of the Bayin-Gobi Formation of Inner Mongolia, China. It includes one species, Bannykus wulatensis. It is large for an alvarezsaur, with an estimated weight of 24 kg based on femoral circumference.

Discovery

The holotype of Bannykus wulatensis is IVPP V25026, a partially-articulated incomplete skeleton. The holotype comes from the Bayin-Gobi Formation in Chaoge, Wulatehouqi, Inner Mongolia, China. It was discovered in 2009 and in 2012, its remains were displayed in Japan under the unofficial name "Wulatesaurus". It was given the binomial name Bannykus wulatensis in 2018; its generic name comes from the Mandarin word Ban, meaning half, and the Greek word , meaning claw. This refers to the transitional characteristics seen in this theropod. The specific name refers to Wulatehouqi (Wulate Rear Banner), the county that the holotype was found in.

Classification
Bannykus, along with Xiyunykus, fills a 70-million year gap in alvarezsaur evolution by exhibiting morphologies intermediate between the typical theropod forelimb of Haplocheirus and the highly reduced forelimbs and minute teeth of Late Cretaceous alvarezsaurids.

References

Alvarezsaurs
Fossil taxa described in 2018
Early Cretaceous dinosaurs of Asia
Monotypic dinosaur genera